In Euclidean geometry, a cyclic quadrilateral or inscribed quadrilateral is a quadrilateral whose vertices all lie on a single circle. This circle is called the circumcircle or circumscribed circle, and the vertices are said to be concyclic. The center of the circle and its radius are called the circumcenter and the circumradius respectively. Other names for these quadrilaterals are concyclic quadrilateral and chordal quadrilateral, the latter since the sides of the quadrilateral are chords of the circumcircle. Usually the quadrilateral is assumed to be convex, but there are also crossed cyclic quadrilaterals. The formulas and properties given below are valid in the convex case.

The word cyclic is from the Ancient Greek  (kuklos), which means "circle" or "wheel".

All triangles have a circumcircle, but not all quadrilaterals do. An example of a quadrilateral that cannot be cyclic is a non-square rhombus. The section characterizations below states what necessary and sufficient conditions a quadrilateral must satisfy to have a circumcircle.

Special cases
Any square, rectangle, isosceles trapezoid, or antiparallelogram is cyclic. A kite is cyclic if and only if it has two right angles – a right kite. A bicentric quadrilateral is a cyclic quadrilateral that is also tangential and an ex-bicentric quadrilateral is a cyclic quadrilateral that is also ex-tangential. A harmonic quadrilateral is a cyclic quadrilateral in which the product of the lengths of opposite sides are equal.

Characterizations

Circumcenter 
A convex quadrilateral is cyclic if and only if the four perpendicular bisectors to the sides are concurrent. This common point is the circumcenter.

Supplementary angles 
A convex quadrilateral  is cyclic if and only if its opposite angles are supplementary, that is

The direct theorem was Proposition 22 in Book 3 of Euclid's Elements. Equivalently, a convex quadrilateral is cyclic if and only if each exterior angle is equal to the opposite interior angle.

In 1836 Duncan Gregory generalized this result as follows: Given any convex cyclic 2n-gon, then the two sums of alternate interior angles are each equal to (n-1).

Taking the stereographic projection (half-angle tangent) of each angle, this can be re-expressed,

Which implies that

Angles between sides and diagonals 
A convex quadrilateral  is cyclic if and only if an angle between a side and a diagonal is equal to the angle between the opposite side and the other diagonal. That is, for example,

Pascal Points 

Intersection of diagonals 

The intersection  may be internal or external to the circle. When the intersection is internal, the equality states that the product of the segment lengths into which  divides one diagonal equals that of the other diagonal. This is known as the intersecting chords theorem since the diagonals of the cyclic quadrilateral are chords of the circumcircle.

Ptolemy's theorem 

where a, b, c, d are the side lengths in order. The converse is also true. That is, if this equation is satisfied in a convex quadrilateral, then a cyclic quadrilateral is formed.

Diagonal triangle 

 is cyclic if and only if the point of intersection of the bimedians of  belongs to the nine-point circle .

Area

This is a corollary of Bretschneider's formula for the general quadrilateral, since opposite angles are supplementary in the cyclic case. If also , the cyclic quadrilateral becomes a triangle and the formula is reduced to Heron's formula.

The cyclic quadrilateral has maximal area among all quadrilaterals having the same side lengths (regardless of sequence). This is another corollary to Bretschneider's formula. It can also be proved using calculus.

Four unequal lengths, each less than the sum of the other three, are the sides of each of three non-congruent cyclic quadrilaterals, which by Brahmagupta's formula all have the same area.

or

or

where  is either angle between the diagonals. Provided  is not a right angle, the area can also be expressed as

Another formula is

where  is the radius of the circumcircle. As a direct consequence,

where there is equality if and only if the quadrilateral is a square.

Diagonals

 and 

so showing Ptolemy's theorem

According to Ptolemy's second theorem,

using the same notations as above.

For the sum of the diagonals we have the inequality

Equality holds if and only if the diagonals have equal length, which can be proved using the AM-GM inequality.

Moreover,

In any convex quadrilateral, the two diagonals together partition the quadrilateral into four triangles; in a cyclic quadrilateral, opposite pairs of these four triangles are similar to each other.

A set of sides that can form a cyclic quadrilateral can be arranged in any of three distinct sequences each of which can form a cyclic quadrilateral of the same area in the same circumcircle (the areas being the same according to Brahmagupta's area formula). Any two of these cyclic quadrilaterals have one diagonal length in common.

Angle formulas

The angle  between the diagonals that is opposite sides  and  satisfies

If the extensions of opposite sides  and  intersect at an angle , then

where  is the semiperimeter.

Parameshvara's circumradius formula

This was derived by the Indian mathematician Vatasseri Parameshvara in the 15th century.

Using Brahmagupta's formula, Parameshvara's formula can be restated as

where  is the area of the cyclic quadrilateral.

Anticenter and collinearities
Four line segments, each perpendicular to one side of a cyclic quadrilateral and passing through the opposite side's midpoint, are concurrent. These line segments are called the maltitudes, which is an abbreviation for midpoint altitude. Their common point is called the anticenter. It has the property of being the reflection of the circumcenter in the "vertex centroid". Thus in a cyclic quadrilateral, the circumcenter, the "vertex centroid", and the anticenter are collinear.

The anticenter of a cyclic quadrilateral is the Poncelet point of its vertices.

Other properties

This is one of the theorems known as the Japanese theorem.
In a cyclic quadrilateral  with circumcenter , let  be the point where the diagonals  and  intersect. This is a direct consequence of the inscribed angle theorem and the exterior angle theorem.
There are no cyclic quadrilaterals with rational area and with unequal rational sides in either arithmetic or geometric progression.

If a cyclic quadrilateral has side lengths that form an arithmetic progression the quadrilateral is also ex-bicentric.

Brahmagupta quadrilaterals
A Brahmagupta quadrilateral is a cyclic quadrilateral with integer sides, integer diagonals, and integer area.

Orthodiagonal case

Circumradius and area
Then (the first equality is Proposition 11 in Archimedes' Book of Lemmas)

where  is the diameter of the circumcircle.  This holds because the diagonals are perpendicular chords of a circle. These equations imply that the circumradius  can be expressed as

or, in terms of the sides of the quadrilateral, as

It also follows that

A formula for the area  of a cyclic orthodiagonal quadrilateral in terms of the four sides is obtained directly when combining Ptolemy's theorem and the formula for the area of an orthodiagonal quadrilateral. The result is

Other properties
In a cyclic orthodiagonal quadrilateral, the anticenter coincides with the point where the diagonals intersect.
Brahmagupta's theorem states that for a cyclic quadrilateral that is also orthodiagonal, the perpendicular from any side through the point of intersection of the diagonals bisects the opposite side.
If a cyclic quadrilateral is also orthodiagonal, the distance from the circumcenter to any side equals half the length of the opposite side.
In a cyclic orthodiagonal quadrilateral, the distance between the midpoints of the diagonals equals the distance between the circumcenter and the point where the diagonals intersect.

Cyclic spherical quadrilaterals 
In spherical geometry, a spherical quadrilateral formed from four intersecting greater circles is cyclic if and only if the summations of the opposite angles are equal, i.e., α + γ = β + δ for consecutive angles α, β, γ, δ of the quadrilateral. One direction of this theorem was proved by I. A. Lexell in 1786. Lexell showed that in a spherical quadrilateral inscribed in a small circle of a sphere the sums of opposite angles are equal, and that in the circumscribed quadrilateral the sums of opposite sides are equal. The first of these theorems is the spherical analogue of a plane theorem, and the second theorem is its dual, that is, the result of interchanging great circles and their poles. Kiper et al. proved a converse of the theorem: If the summations of the opposite sides are equal in a spherical quadrilateral, then there exists an inscribing circle for this quadrilateral.

See also
Butterfly theorem
Cyclic polygon
Power of a point
Ptolemy's table of chords
Robbins pentagon

References

Further reading 
D. Fraivert: Pascal-points quadrilaterals inscribed in a cyclic quadrilateral

External links
Derivation of Formula for the Area of Cyclic Quadrilateral
Incenters in Cyclic Quadrilateral at cut-the-knot
Four Concurrent Lines in a Cyclic Quadrilateral at cut-the-knot

Types of quadrilaterals